Pembroke and Haverfordwest was a parliamentary constituency centred on the towns of Pembroke and Haverfordwest in West Wales.  It returned one Member of Parliament (MP) to the House of Commons of the Parliament of the United Kingdom, elected by the first past the post system.

History 

The constituency was created by the Redistribution of Seats Act 1885 for the 1885 general election, replacing the former Pembroke constituency. It was abolished for the 1918 general election.

The first member was H.G. Allen, Liberal member for Pembroke Boroughs since 1880. In 1886, Allen was among the Liberal members who broke with Gladstone over Irish Home Rule but, despite suggestions that the Conservatives would stand aside in his favour, Allen chose not to defend the seat as a Liberal Unionist. The seat was captured by the Conservatives at the subsequent election and remained a marginal constituency thereafter, changing hands on several occasions.

Boundaries
Comprising the boroughs of Pembroke, Tenby, Wiston, Milford, Haverfordwest, Fishguard, and Narberth and part of the parish of Llanstadwell.

Members of Parliament

Elections

Elections in the 1880s

Elections in the 1890s

Elections in the 1900s 

The count following the election initially recorded a Conservative victory by 2,679 to 2,667, a majority of 12. After a partial recount the margin had increased to 17 (2,679 to 2,662) with five reserved ballot papers. The Liberal campaign lodged a petition. Judges reviewed the reserved ballots and took the view that the result should be 2,679 to 2,664. The Liberal campaign accepted that review and withdrew their petition.

Elections in the 1910s 

General Election 1914–15:

Another General Election was required to take place before the end of 1915. The political parties had been making preparations for an election to take place and by July 1914, the following candidates had been selected; 
Liberal: Henry Guest
Unionist: David Hughes-Morgan

References

Politics of Pembrokeshire
Historic parliamentary constituencies in South Wales
Constituencies of the Parliament of the United Kingdom established in 1885
Constituencies of the Parliament of the United Kingdom disestablished in 1918